Abdelhalim Kaouane (born 29 November 1981) is an Algerian professional basketball player. He has played for the Algeria national basketball team.

Honours

Club
Al-Nasr Benghazi

 Libyan League :  2007. 2009
 Libyan Cup :  2009
 Libyan Super Cup  :  2007
CSM Constantine
Super Division: 2013.

References

External links
 Profile basketball.afrobasket

Algerian men's basketball players
Point guards
1981 births
Living people
Algerian expatriate basketball people in Libya
GS Pétroliers basketball players
21st-century Algerian people